Lola Skrbková, real name Aloisie Skrbková (16 February 1902, in Čáslav – 28 September 1978, in Brno) was a Czech actress. She starred in the 1969/1970 film Witchhammer under director Otakar Vávra. She also worked on several films with the influential Devětsil artist Emil František Burian, who directed her in his 1939 adaptation of a Božena Benešová novel, Věra Lukášová.

Selected filmography
 Rozina, the Love Child (1945)

References

Czech film actresses
Czech stage actresses
1902 births
1978 deaths
People from Čáslav
20th-century Czech actresses